Orthogonius ovatus is a species of ground beetle in the subfamily Orthogoniinae. It was described by Maximilien Chaudoir in 1878.

References

ovatulus
Beetles described in 1878